Kentucky Route 1065 (KY 1065) is a  state highway located in Louisville, Kentucky. The western terminus of the route is at Kentucky Route 907 a short distance west of Kentucky Route 841 (Gene Snyder Freeway) exit 6 in the Louisville neighborhood of Auburndale. The eastern terminus is at Kentucky Route 1819 in Fern Creek.

The route is known as the Outer Loop, Beulah Church Road, Seatonville Road, and Lovers Lane. It passes by what was the Louisville Motor Speedway and intersects Interstate 65 and the U.S. Route 31E/U.S. Route 150 concurrency.

Route description
KY 1065 begins at an intersection with KY 907 in the Auburndale section of Louisville, heading east on two-lane undivided Outer Loop. The road crosses a CSX railroad line and heads between homes to the north and commercial establishments to the south. The route passes near shopping centers and comes to an intersection with KY 1865. KY 1065 continues through wooded areas with some nearby homes and commercial areas, reaching the KY 1020 junction. Past this, the route becomes a four-lane divided highway and heads through areas of businesses and industry, coming to a bridge over a CSX railroad line. The road passes through more industrial areas and heads to the south of a landfill as a four-lane undivided road before becoming a divided highway again as it comes to an interchange with I-65.  Past this interchange, KY 1065 passes near residential neighborhoods prior to reaching an intersection with KY 61 in a commercial area. The road continues east past several shopping centers and passes to the south of Jefferson Mall. The route heads through residential areas with some businesses and intersects the southern terminus of KY 2052.

KY 1065 becomes a three-lane road with a center left-turn lane and heads east through more suburban development. The route curves northeast and intersects KY 864, at which point it turns southeast to form a concurrency with that route on Beulah Church Road. The road curves east, and KY 864 splits to the south. KY 1065 continues east on two-lane Beulah Church Road and passes through wooded residential neighborhoods, curving to the northeast. The route turns east and comes to an intersection with US 31E/US 150. Past this intersection, the road becomes Seatonville Road and heads east through more wooded areas of homes. KY 1065 turns east onto Lovers Lane and winds north and east through areas of fields and homes. The route continues north through more homes and woodland, coming to its eastern terminus at KY 1819.

Major intersections

See also
Roads in Louisville, Kentucky

References

External links

1065
1065
Transportation in Jefferson County, Kentucky